The Day After Yesterday is the 14th studio album by Australian singer-songwriter Rick Springfield, released in 2005.
It spent a single week on Billboards album chart, peaking at #197. The album is composed largely of covers of his favorite songs written by other contemporary artists.

Track listing
All guitars by Rick Springfield, with John 5 for tracks 4 & 14.Total length: 1:10:40There is a  Limited Edition CD/DVD set which includes two CDs.CD 01: Same as above, with the addition of one more track:CD 02'

The DVD includes Springfield's headlined performance on EFX Alive! at the MGM Grand.

References

2005 albums
Rick Springfield albums
Covers albums